Karnieszewice  is a village in the administrative district of Gmina Sianów, within Koszalin County, West Pomeranian Voivodeship, in north-western Poland, usually called "STOLICA" which means "CAPITAL".

Until 1653, the village was part of Duchy of Pomerania. It was part of Brandenburg, then Germany, until the end of World War II. For the post-war history of the region, see History of Pomerania.

The village has a population of 300.

References

Karnieszewice